Toytown is one of the largest independent toy and nursery retailers in the UK and Northern Ireland. With 33 stores throughout the UK and Northern Ireland the independent toy retail chain was founded in Belfast in 1979.

Stores 
: 33

About
Managing Director Alan Simpson opened his first Toytown store on Castlereagh Road, Belfast in 1979. The family-run company later moved its operations to Newtownards where it remains today.

Operations 
Toytown currently employs over 200 staff and operates 33 stores in total, 10 in Northern Ireland (including a Babyworld store) and 23 in England and Scotland.

Some Toytown stores boast nursery departments under the 'Babyworld at Toytown' banner and stock a wide range of prams, pushchairs, cots and other goods.

The company is still expanding over the UK and Northern Ireland, with the 33rd store having opened at The Gyle, Edinburgh in June 2021.

History 

After 22 years of trading in Northern Ireland, Toytown expanded into the UK mainland in 2001, opening up in a few ex Beatties of London stores. In 2006 it opened its first concession store, followed by a first outlet branch in 2007.

In 2008 Toytown, due to the growth of their concession business, began to open stores within department stores throughout the UK.

In 2013 and 2016 Toytown won the British Association of Toy Retailers Toy Shop Of The Year award in the specialist multiple category (up to 30 branches) and in both 2014 and 2015 they were shortlisted in the same category. More success followed in 2017 when Toytown swept the board, winning both Specialist Multiple Toy Retailer of the Year (over 25 stores) and the coveted Overall Toy Retailer of the year. In 2018, they were further shortlisted for the Specialist Multiple Toy Retailer of the Year award (2–29 stores). 
In 2020, Toytown were finalists in the Progressive Preschool Awards 'Best Multiple Retailer of Preschool Products' category.

2020 has seen the company continue with an ambitious expansion campaign, opening 5 new stores and launching a new website www.toytownstores.com.
2021 saw a further 2 stores opening - Merry Hill, Dudley and Gyle, Edinburgh.

Toytown were a founding member of AIS Play-Room.

References

External links 
 
 Toy News Interview
 Toy Retailer Of The Year 2014
 Alan Simpson AIS Toy Committee

Companies based in Belfast
Retail companies established in 1979
1979 establishments in Northern Ireland
Toy retailers of Ireland
Toy retailers of the United Kingdom